Church Ridge is a southwest-trending ridge,  long, with several peaks over  high. The ridge separates the flow of nearby Church Glacier and Leander Glacier in the Admiralty Mountains, a major mountain range lying situated in Victoria Land, Antarctica. The ridge was mapped by the United States Geological Survey from surveys and from U.S. Navy aerial photography, 1960–63, and named by the Advisory Committee on Antarctic Names for Commander A.E. Church, U.S. Navy, assistant chief of staff for civil engineering with the U.S. Naval Support Force, Antarctica, 1967 and 1968. The ridge lies on the Pennell Coast, a portion of Antarctica lying between Cape Williams and Cape Adare.

References 

Ridges of Victoria Land
Pennell Coast